Santiago Arias Naranjo (born 13 January 1992) is a Colombian professional footballer who plays as a right-back for Major League Soccer club FC Cincinnati and the Colombia national team.

Club career

La Equidad 
Arias was a youth product of the La Equidad academy. He was moved into the senior squad during 2009 making his professional debut that same year against Deportes Tolima. He soon became a regular for the Bogotá based club and racked up 28 appearances. His notable performances earned him the opportunity to represent his nation at the 2011 FIFA U-20 World Cup hosted in Colombia. After a successful spell at his club and internationally, he soon moved to Portugal to join the ranks of Lisbon team Sporting CP.

Sporting CP 
While representing the U20 national Colombian side in 2011, Arias attracted the scouts of Sporting CP. On 1 July 2011, Arias was ultimately signed by Sporting on a 5-year contract for a transfer free of €300,000. He made his European debut on 6 November replacing Matías Fernández in the 80th minute against U.D. Leiria. Despite making his first team debut, Arias spent most of his playing time with the B-Squad where he scored a goal in 28 appearances. He occasionally made appearances with the first squad, but never broke in for a permanent spot.

PSV 
In early 2013, Arias was linked to the Dutch club PSV but nothing was finalized. In July 2013, Arias was once again linked to the club where both parties agreed on finalizing a deal. It was then reported that Arias signed a four-year contract and PSV paid Sporting €1.6 million for a package deal including fellow Sporting teammate Stijn Schaars. Upon his arrival, Arias was handed the number 13 shirt. He made his league debut on 3 August, playing a full 90 minutes in a 2–3 away win against ADO Den Haag. He made his first direct contribution for PSV as he scored the opening goal in a 3–2 home win over FC Twente. Arias made 25 league appearances for the 2013–14 Eredivisie with PSV placing fourth thus earning a place in the 2014–15 UEFA Europa League Third qualifying round.

Arias appeared for the first time in a European competition in a match against SKN St. Pölten coming on as a second-half substitute in a match where PSV won 2-3. He then appeared in four group stage matches and played the first leg of the Round of 36 against FC Zenit Saint Petersburg. Subsequent to an injury, Arias was ruled out of the second leg with his team being knocked out 4-0 on aggregate.

Despite an early exit from the Europa League, PSV were crowned 2014–15 Eredivisie thus making the conquest Arias's first European title. It was also the club's first title in eight years.

In the 1–2 Champions League group stage loss against Bayern München, Arias scored the opening goal with a header, which possibly came from an offside position.

He played on 15 April 2018 as PSV beat rivals Ajax 3–0 to clinch the 2017-18 Eredivisie title. The title would be Arias' 5th Dutch trophy in just 5 seasons within the Netherlands. Arias would then be named the Eredivisie Player of the Year, having assisted 6 goals and scoring 3, as well as holding an 82% passing accuracy and winning 134 take ons. He was also named in the league's best XI of the season.

Atlético Madrid
On 31 July 2018, it was announced that Arias completed a transfer to Atlético Madrid for a reported transfer fee of £11 million. Upon his arrival, Arias was handed the number 4 shirt.

He made his unofficial debut in friendly against Cagliari replacing Juanfran at the start of the second half. Atlético went on to win the match with Borja Garcés scoring the sole goal. He made his league debut for the club on 1 September, coming on as a substitute for José Giménez in a 2–0 defeat against Celta de Vigo. On 19 January 2019, he scored his first goal for Los Rojiblancos in a 0–3 defeat of SD Huesca.

Loan to Bayer Leverkusen 
On 24 September 2020, Arias joined Bayer Leverkusen on a season-long loan with an option to buy. A severe injury suffered in October while on international duty, however, cut his Leverkusen career short to a single Bundesliga appearance, sidelining him for the remainder of the season with a fractured fibula and damaged ligaments in his left ankle.

Loan to Granada 
On 30 August 2021, Arias moved to Granada CF on a one-year loan deal.

FC Cincinnati 
On 9 February 2023, Arias joined Major League Soccer club FC Cincinnati on a one-year contract with the option of an additional year.

International career

Youth 
Arias was part of the Colombia U17 team that finished fourth in the 2009 FIFA U-17 World Cup, playing all matches (except third place match, making a total of 6 appearances) and scoring the first penalty during the quarter-final penalty shoot-out against Turkey.

In 2011, Arias played all 9 matches for the Colombia U-20 team when they finished sixth in the 2011 South American Youth Championship. Eduardo Lara, Colombia's coach, also called him for the 2011 Toulon Tournament where Arias, who started all 5 matches, was part of Colombia's team that won the final.

Senior 
In September 2013, Arias received his first call up for Colombia's senior team to dispute the 2014 World Cup qualifying matches against Chile and Paraguay, following first choice Camilo Zúñiga's injury. He made his debut against Paraguay and played the entire match in a 1–2 away victory at Asunción.

Arias was included in Colombia's 23-man squad for the 2014 FIFA World Cup in Brazil. He made three appearances in the tournament, coming on as a substitute in all of Colombia's group stage matches. The following year, Arias was included in the final squad for the 2015 Copa America. He appeared twice at the tournament, including the quarter-final 0–0 draw against Argentina where Colombia were eliminated 5–4 on penalties.

He was a part of the Colombian squad that finished third place at the Copa América Centenario.

Arias was selected in José Pékerman's 23-man squad for the 2018 FIFA World Cup in Russia. He started in all four of Colombia's matches as his nation was eliminated in the Round of 16 against England.

Personal life
On 3 September 2020, he tested positive for COVID-19.

Career statistics

Club

International

Honours 
PSV
 Eredivisie: 2014–15, 2015–16, 2017–18
 Johan Cruijff Shield: 2015, 2016

Atlético Madrid
 UEFA Super Cup: 2018

Colombia U20
 Toulon Tournament: 2011

Colombia
 Copa América third place: 2016

Individual
 Eredivisie Player of the Year: 2017–18
 Eredivisie Star XI: 2017–18
 Eredivisie Player of the Month: March 2018

References

External links 
 
 
 Santiago Arias at Voetbal International 

1992 births
Living people
Colombian footballers
Colombia international footballers
Colombia youth international footballers
Colombia under-20 international footballers
Colombian expatriate footballers
Association football defenders
Categoría Primera A players
Primeira Liga players
Liga Portugal 2 players
Eredivisie players
Eerste Divisie players
La Liga players
Bundesliga players
Major League Soccer players
La Equidad footballers
Sporting CP footballers
Sporting CP B players
PSV Eindhoven players
Jong PSV players
Atlético Madrid footballers
Bayer 04 Leverkusen players
Granada CF footballers
FC Cincinnati players
Expatriate footballers in Germany
Expatriate footballers in the Netherlands
Expatriate footballers in Portugal
Expatriate footballers in Spain
Expatriate soccer players in the United States
Colombian expatriate sportspeople in Germany
Colombian expatriate sportspeople in the Netherlands
Colombian expatriate sportspeople in Portugal
Colombian expatriate sportspeople in Spain
Colombian expatriate sportspeople in the United States
Footballers from Medellín
2014 FIFA World Cup players
2015 Copa América players
Copa América Centenario players
2018 FIFA World Cup players
2019 Copa América players